Kulai is a locality in the northern part of Mangalore city . It is near Surathkal, a northern suburb of Mangalore. It houses two well known temples namely Shree Vishnumurthy Temple & Chitrapura Shree Durgaparameshwari  Temple. The area was covered with paddy fields, coconut gardens and forest (padi in Tulu) earlier. Now it has become a residential cum commercial area. Kulai comes under Mangalore city north and it has got excellent bus connectivity from Statebank and other parts of the city. 

Honnakatte junction in Kulai is one of the busiest junctions in Mangalore which connects MRPL, HPCL, BASF & other petrochemical industries to Mangalore city. Kulai is one of the fastest developing residential & commercial regions in Mangalore. An all weather fishing harbour is being constructed at Kulai to enhance the fishing activities in northern parts of Mangalore with all modern facilities. Kulai is also famous for various marble & granite showrooms in Mangalore.In 1980's and 1990's there was Shetty Icecreams factory and ice cream parlour at Kulai where one could get tasty and yummy ice creams and buffalo milk.

Localities in Mangalore